Mount Selman is an unincorporated community in Cherokee County, Texas, United States. According to the Handbook of Texas, the community had a population of 200 in 2000. It is located within the Tyler-Jacksonville combined statistical area.

History
Mount Selman was established in 1884 along the Kansas and Gulf Short Line Railroad. Dr. R.D. Bone, J.W. Wade, and J.N. and W.T. McKee named the community Selman for Dr. James Selman, who donated land for the community. Its post office opened the same year as its creation and was renamed Mount Selman because there was another community named Selman elsewhere in the state. In 1892, Mount Selman had 125 residents, alongside a gristmill and gin, a Presbyterian church, a general store, a drugstore, dry goods, and grocery stores. The community became a shipping center along the railroad for peaches, plums, and tomatoes. Its population peaked at 500 in 1914, and the town began to decline after that point. It went down to 220 and had five businesses in the early 1950s, causing many of the remaining stores to close. The post office closed in 1973 while mail was sent from Bullard, and the population was estimated at 200 in 2000. It had several churches, a community center, and several scattered houses in 1990.

In 1986 and 1990, Mount Selman had two of the tallest structures standing higher than 400 meters: Pinnacle Towers Mount Selman for KETK-TV and KOOI and Media General Operations Tower Youngstown (see List of tallest structures – 400 to 500 metres).

On April 9, 2015, an EF-2 tornado struck Mount Selman, snapping and uprooting trees, damaging outbuildings, and removing the roof and collapsing a few exterior walls of a house.

Geography

Education
Today, the community is served by the Jacksonville Independent School District.

References

Unincorporated communities in Cherokee County, Texas
Unincorporated communities in Texas